Hoplocryptanthus lavrasensis is a species of flowering plant in the family Bromeliaceae, endemic to Brazil (the state of Minas Gerais). It was first described in 2007 by Elton Leme as Cryptanthus lavrasensis.

References

Bromelioideae
Flora of Brazil
Plants described in 2007